Panchakarla Ramesh Babu is an Indian politician from the YSR Congress Party. He is a former member of the Andhra Pradesh Legislative Assembly from Elamanchili constituency. He joined YSR Congress Party on 28 August 2020.

References

Living people
Telugu Desam Party politicians
Andhra Pradesh MLAs 2019–2024
Year of birth missing (living people)